Machów is the southern part of the city of Tarnobrzeg in Podkarpackie Voivodeship, southeastern Poland. Before 1976 it was a separate village. The first settlements in the area are dated to between the  6th and 8th centuries. Between the 1950s and 1990s it was famous as a center of production of sulfur (Siarkopol). In 2000's in the old mine Machowski Reservoir was created.

References

External links 
 Tarnobrzeg Town Television film about Machów

Districts of Tarnobrzeg